Sunnyfields is a suburb of Doncaster, South Yorkshire, England. It lies to the east of Scawsby and to the west of Scawthorpe.

Located less than a mile from the A1(M), the nearest railway stations are Bentley and Doncaster. This puts it in a good location for those commuting to Doncaster, Sheffield, Leeds or beyond.

Doncaster